Oahu National Wildlife Refuge Complex is a National Wildlife Refuge complex in the state of Hawaii.

Refuges within the complex
James Campbell National Wildlife Refuge
Oahu Forest National Wildlife Refuge

References

External links
 Official website

National Wildlife Refuges in Hawaii